The Médio Juruá Extractive Reserve is an extractive reserve in the state of Amazonas Brazil.

Location

The Médio Juruá Extractive Reserve is in the municipality of Carauari in the state of Amazonas.
The terrain is flat.
The reserve is on the left bank of the Juruá River, which meanders in a generally northeast direction.
It contains oxbow lakes from former meanders.
The population practices agriculture on the convex margins of the river, with their homes slightly higher up.

Environment

The Médio Juruá Extractive Reserve is in the Amazon biome.
Vegetation is relatively intact due to the distance from urban centres, with very high biodiversity.
Human activity has little impact, with degraded areas recovering quickly. Endemic species of flora include rubber trees (Hevea species), Ocotea species), Virola surinamensis, Calycophyllum spruceanum and Bombax globosum.

Fauna include  white-lipped peccary (Tayassu pecari), red brocket (Mazama americana), South American tapir (Tapirus terrestris), red-handed howler (Alouatta belzebul), Parrot species, Amazonian manatee (Trichechus inunguis), jaguar (Panthera onca), black caiman (Melanosuchus niger), Alagoas curassow (Mitu mitu), Piping guan (Pipile), Crypturellus species and fish such as Arapaima gigas, tambaqui (Colossoma macropomum) and silver arowana (Osteoglossum bicirrhosum).

History

The Médio Juruá Extractive Reserve was created by presidential decree on 4 March 1997.
It is administered by the Chico Mendes Institute for Biodiversity Conservation (ICMBio).
It is classified as IUCN protected area category VI (protected area with sustainable use of natural resources).
The extractive reserve is an area used by the traditional population who practice extraction, subsistence agriculture and small scale livestock husbandry.
Its basic objectives are to protect the livelihoods and culture of these people and to ensure sustainable use of the natural resources.
The land is all publicly owned.

The utilisation plan was approved on 24 November 1997.
On 23 November 1999, the Instituto Nacional de Colonização e Reforma Agrária (National Institute for Colonization and Agrarian Reform) recognized the extractive reserve as an Agro-extractive settlement project for 280 families.
It became part of the Central Amazon Ecological Corridor, established in 2002.
On 29 January 2007, IBAMA created a deliberative council.
The deliberative council, which manages the reserve, is chaired by ICMBio and has representatives of public and civil society organisations and the traditional population.
The conservation unit is supported by the Amazon Region Protected Areas Program.

Notes

Sources

1997 establishments in Brazil
Extractive reserves of Brazil
Protected areas of Amazonas (Brazilian state)